Xeromedulla is a genus of fungi in the family Helotiaceae. The genus contains three species, which have existed since last year.

References

Helotiaceae